The Kali River goonch attacks were a series of fatal attacks on humans believed to be perpetrated by a goonch weighing  in three villages on the banks of the Kali River in India and Nepal, between 1998 and 2007. This is the subject of a TV documentary aired on 22 October 2008, as well as an episode about the Kali River goonch attacks on the Animal Planet series River Monsters.

Attacks
The first attack occurred in April 1998, when at 13:00, 17-year-old Dil Bahadur, while swimming in the river, was dragged underwater in front of his girlfriend and several eyewitnesses. No remains were found, even after a three-day search spanning 5 kilometers (3.11 miles). 
Three months later, at Dharma Ghat, a young boy was pulled underwater in front of his father, who watched helplessly. No corpse was ever found.
The final attack occurred in 2007 when an 18-year-old Nepalese man disappeared in the river, dragged down by something described as a mud-colored "water pig".

Investigation

British biologist Jeremy Wade volunteered to capture the perpetrator. Though originally skeptical of the truth behind the attacks, he later became intrigued because the attacks only occurred in a specific area spanning . He was told by the villagers that the creature likely developed a taste for human flesh and had grown large after eating half-burnt human remains discarded from funeral pyres on the river banks. After examining the water where Bahadur had disappeared with a depth sounder, Wade discounted the possibility of the boy having been dragged by a whirlpool, as the attacks all occurred in areas without turbulence. Wade theorised that the creature would have had to weigh  in order to do so. A buffalo weighs , according to the film.

All three species of crocodile possible in the area were dismissed: saltwater crocodiles are not known to travel so far inland; the jaw structure of gharials prevents them from killing humans or buffalo; and mugger crocodiles, the most common Indian species, do not inhabit the cold torrents of the Kali River. Also, crocodiles had never been seen on land to bask or breed. Although bull sharks were initially considered, an underwater investigation by marine biologist Rick Rosenthal in the area where the buffalo disappeared yielded no sightings of bull sharks. Further, Wade believed that bull sharks would not have lived so far upriver, and there had been no sightings of dorsal fins breaking the water's surface. However, during the underwater investigation, a  goonch catfish was sighted, which Wade unsuccessfully tried to capture. Later underwater investigations yielded numerous group sightings of goonch, six of which were man-sized.
After an unsuccessful attempt was made at capturing one with a fishing rod, a funeral pyre was set up in order to lure one in. Although Wade estimated that the fish was strong and large enough to eat a small child, he stated in an interview that he believed that larger specimens were likely to exist, and that the specimen he captured was not large enough to be the alleged maneater, on the basis of the sizes of the victims.

These events were shown on his program River Monsters.

References

Deaths due to fish attacks
Man-eaters of India
Fish attacks
Fish of India
1998 in India
1998 in Nepal
Fish of Nepal